No. 21 Squadron of the Royal Air Force was formed in 1915 and was disbanded for the last time in 1979.

The squadron is famous for Operation Jericho on 18 February 1944, when the crews of Mosquitoes breached the walls of a Gestapo prison at Amiens, France, allowing members of the French Resistance to escape.

History

World War One
No. 21 Squadron Royal Flying Corps was formed at Netheravon on 23 July 1915, equipped with the Royal Aircraft Factory R.E.7. After six months of training, the squadron was sent to the France in January 1916. The main role for its R.E.7s was reconnaissance, while it also operated small numbers of Bristol Scout Ds and a single Martinsyde G.100 as escort fighters. Although the R.E.7 was badly underpowered, 21 Squadron used its R.E.7s as bombers during the Battle of the Somme, being the first Squadron to drop  bombs.

It discarded its R.E.7s in August 1916, replacing them by single seat Royal Aircraft Factory B.E.12s. These were used as bombers, and despite being almost useless at the role, as fighters. In February 1917, the Squadron re-equipped again, receiving the R.E.8, and gave a good account of itself in the Corps Reconnaissance role. On one day, 7 June 1917, at the beginning of the Battle of Messines, its artillery spotting was responsible for putting 72 German batteries out of action. This led General Trenchard, the commander of the Royal Flying Corps in France, to describe No. 21 as "the best artillery squadron in France".

In April 1918, 21 Squadron were based at Saint Inglevert. After the end of the war the squadron handed over its aircraft to 13 Squadron and was disbanded on 1 October 1919.

Light bomber squadron
The squadron was reformed on 3 December 1935 at RAF Bircham Newton as a light bomber squadron equipped with the Hawker Hind biplane. It moved to RAF Abbotsinch, Glasgow on 22 July 1936 and transferred to No. 2 Group on 1 August that year but transferred again, this time to No. 1 Group on 6 October. The squadron moved to RAF Lympne in Kent in November 1936. By August 1938 it began to receive the more modern Bristol Blenheim monoplane and moved to RAF Eastchurch, also in Kent.  The Munich crisis saw the squadron mobilise in preparation for war with Germany. The squadron temporarily joined 2 Group on 27 September and moved to RAF Cottesmore, before the end of the crisis on 8 October saw the squadron return to 1 Group and Eastchurch. On 1 January 1939, the squadron rejoined 2 Group, and moved to RAF Watton in Norfolk on 2 March 1939.

On the outbreak of the Second World War, the squadron was converting to the Blenheim IV and so was not fully operational, mainly flying reconnaissance missions. In May 1940, during the Battle of France it began daylight attacks on advancing German columns in the Low Countries and France, flying its first mission of the campaign on 11 May, when 11 Blenheims attacked a bridge at Maastricht for no result except for two Blenheims shot down and eight damaged. From June to October 1940 the squadron operated from RAF Lossiemouth in Scotland to attack German shipping off the coast of Norway and to deter any German invasion across the North Sea. Back in Norfolk the squadron began regular low-level attacks on enemy shipping. On 26 April, a detachment of six Blenheims from 21 Squadron was detached to Malta in April 1941, serving there until May. The operation was considered successful, and as a result squadrons of 2 Group were regularly despatched to Malta, operating there for about five weeks before ferrying the aircraft to North Africa, with some pilots returning home and some remaining in theatre. At the end of 1941 the squadron again moved to Malta to attack Italian shipping and targets in Italy and Libya. By this time Malta was under heavy air attack and the squadron took heavy losses both during combat (with landing back at Malta becoming increasingly dangerous owing to the heavy presence of enemy fighters), and owing to bombing of the aircraft on the ground at RAF Luqa. The squadron was disbanded in Malta on 14 March 1942.

On the same day a new 21 Squadron was formed at RAF Bodney, still with the Blenheim, but re-equipped a few months later with the Lockheed Ventura. It was the first RAF squadron to use the Ventura, moving to RAF Methwold on 1 November. It flew its first operational mission using the Ventura, a low-level attack by three aircraft on railway lines near Hengelo in the Netherlands, on 3 November. On 6 December it took part in Operation Oyster, a large-scale attack by 2 Group on the Philips works at Eindhoven, with three of its aircraft being lost. The aircraft was never really suitable for the squadron's activities and they were replaced by October 1943 with the de Havilland Mosquito, having flown its last missions using the Ventura (and the last Ventura operations by 2 Group) on 9 September. The squadron turned to night raids on continental Europe; and from the end of 1943, like the rest of 2 Group, largely concentrated on Operation Crossbow, the campaign of attacks against V-1 flying bomb sites. The allied invasion of Normandy in June 1944 saw 2 Group's Mosquito squadrons, including 21 Squadron, employed on night-time interdiction missions to delay the flow of German troops to oppose the invasion. The squadron also carried out precision daylight raids including involvement in Operation Jericho on 18 February 1944 (where its aircraft served as a reserve force that did not need to drop their bombs), a notable attack on Gestapo headquarters at Aarhus in Denmark on 31 October 1944 and in Operation Carthage, against Gestapo headquarters in Copenhagen.

The Squadron moved to bases in France in February 1945, and then to RAF Gutersloh in Germany in December 1945. It provided courier services between Blackbushe and Nuremberg in support of the Nuremberg Trials before it was disbanded on 7 November 1947.

Jet bombers
On 21 September 1953 the squadron was reformed at RAF Scampton as a bomber unit with the English Electric Canberra as part of a four-squadron Canberra wing. The Scampton wing was dispersed in 1955 to allow Scampton to be redeveloped as a base for V-bombers, with 21 Squadron moving to RAF Waddington in May 1955. It was involved in many overseas detachments, and was part of the forces involved in the Suez operation of 1956. The squadron was disbanded on 30 June 1957 at Waddington.

On 1 October 1958, 542 Squadron, based at RAF Upwood and equipped with the Canberra B6 which were used to collect airborne particle samples in support of nuclear weapons testing, was re-numbered as 21 Squadron. The squadron, with a detachment at Laverton, Western Australia continued to support British nuclear testing. The squadron was disbanded again on 15 January 1959.

Transport squadron
Formation again on 1 May 1959 at RAF Benson saw a completely different role for the squadron: it was equipped with the Scottish Aviation Twin Pioneer as a light transport squadron. It moved to Kenya in September that year, being based at RAF Eastleigh, Nairobi. It operated in support of the British Army, the King's African Rifles and the Kenyan Police. The squadron moved to Aden in June 1965, taking over the Twin Pioneers of No.78 Squadron and supplementing them with Douglas Dakotas and Hawker Siddeley Andovers. With the withdrawal of British forces from Aden the squadron was disbanded on 9 September 1967.

The squadron's last formation was on 3 February 1969, when the Western Communications Squadron was re-designated at RAF Andover. It provided transport for senior officers in the western part of the United Kingdom using the Devon and Pembroke. It was disbanded following defence cuts on 31 March 1976.

Aircraft operated
 1915 – Royal Aircraft Factory R.E.7
 1916 – Bristol Scout
 1916 – Royal Aircraft Factory B.E.2c
 1916 – Royal Aircraft Factory B.E.2e
 1916 – Martinsyde G.100
 1916 – Royal Aircraft Factory B.E.12
 1917 – Royal Aircraft Factory R.E.8
 1935 – Hawker Hind
 1938 – Bristol Blenheim I
 1939 – Bristol Blenheim IV
 1942 – Lockheed Ventura I
 1942 – Lockheed Ventura II
 1943 – de Havilland Mosquito VI
 1953 – English Electric Canberra B2
 1958 – English Electric Canberra B6
 1959 – Scottish Aviation Twin Pioneer CC1
 1965 – Douglas Dakota
 1967 – Hawker Siddeley Andover CC2
 1969 – De Havilland Devon C2
 1969 – Percival Pembroke C1

See also
 List of Royal Air Force aircraft squadrons

References

 The Illustrated Encyclopedia of Aircraft (Part Work 1982–1985). London: Orbis Publishing.

External links

 Official RAF 21 Squadron history
 Squadron history on 'Air of Authority'

021
Military units and formations established in 1915
021 Squadron
Military units and formations disestablished in 1979
1915 establishments in the United Kingdom